The Slingsby T67 Firefly, originally produced as the Fournier RF-6, is a two-seat aerobatic training aircraft, built by Slingsby Aviation in Kirkbymoorside, Yorkshire, England.

It has been used as a trainer aircraft by several armed forces, as well as civilian operators. In the mid-1990s, the aircraft became controversial in the United States after three fatal accidents during US Air Force training operations. The Firefly has poor spin recovery, and has been involved in at least 36 fatal accidents.

Development
An all-wooden construction, it featured a high aspect-ratio wing echoing his earlier motorglider designs. Fournier set up his own factory at Nitray to manufacture the design, but after only around 40 had been built, the exercise proved financially unviable, and he was forced to close down production.

In 1981, Fournier sold the development rights of the RF-6B to Slingsby Aviation, which renamed it the T67. The earliest examples, the T67A, were virtually identical to the Fournier-built aircraft, but the design was soon revised to replace the wooden structure with one of composite material. Slingsby produced several versions developing the airframe and adding progressively larger engines. The Slingsby T67M, aimed at the military (hence "M") training market, was the first to include a constant-speed propeller and inverted fuel and oil systems. Over 250 aircraft have been built, mainly the T67M260 and closely related T-3A variants.

Operational history

The largest Firefly operator was the United States Air Force, where it was given the designation T-3A Firefly. The Firefly was selected in 1992 to replace the T-41 aircraft for the command's Enhanced Flight Screening Program, which would include aerobatic maneuvers. From 1993 to 1995, 113 aircraft were purchased and delivered to Hondo Municipal Airport in Texas, and the U.S. Air Force Academy in Colorado. The type was meant to not only replace the Cessna T-41 introductory trainer, but also to meet the Enhanced Flight Screening Program (EFSP) requirements. The Commander of the Air Education and Training Command  stood down the entire T-3A fleet in July 1997 as a result of uncommanded engine stoppages during flight and ground operations. A major factor driving the decision were the three T-3A Class A mishaps. Three Air Force Academy cadets and three instructors were killed in these T-3A mishaps. The US Air Force has no replacement for this type, as it no longer provides training to non-fliers. The aircraft were eventually declared in excess of need in the early 2000s and disposed of by scrapping in 2006.

The Royal Air Force used 22 Slingsby T67M260s as their basic trainer between 1995 and 2010. Over 100,000 flight hours were flown out of RAF Barkston Heath by Army, Royal Navy and Royal Marines students, and at RAF Church Fenton with RAF and foreign students.

The Firefly has also been used by the Royal Hong Kong Auxiliary Air Force, and the Royal Jordanian Air Force (still currently used).

The Firefly was used in Britain for basic aerobatic training in the 2000s. In December 2012, the National Flying Laboratory Centre at Cranfield University in the UK acquired a T67M260 to supplement its Scottish Aviation Bulldog aerobatic trainer for MSc student flight experience and training. As of 2019 the Firefly is used in UPRT courses.

Variants

RF-6B
Main Fournier production series with Rolls-Royce-built Continental O-200  engine (43 built)

RF-6B/120
RF-6B with Lycoming O-235  engine, one built

RF-6C
Four-seat version of RF-6B built by Sportavia with Lycoming O-320 engine, four built, developed into Sportavia RS-180

T67A
Slingsby-built RF-6B/120 certified on 1 October 1981, O-235 118hp engine, wooden construction, 2 blade fixed prop, fuel in firewall tank, single piece canopy, ten built

T67M Firefly
First flown on 5 December 1982 and certified on 2 August 1983, the T67M was developed from the T67A as a glass-reinforced plastic aircraft for a role as a military trainer. The T67M has a  fuel-injected Lycoming AEIO320-D1B and a two-blade Hoffman HO-V72L-V/180CB constant-speed propeller, single piece canopy, fuel in firewall tank. The fuel-injected engine with inverted fuel and oil systems allowed the aircraft to perform sustained negative-G (inverted) aerobatics, although inverted spins were never formally approved. A total of 32 T67Ms (including the later T67M MkII) were produced.

T67B
First flown on 16 April 1981 and certified on 18 September 1984, the T67B was effectively the T67A made, like the T67M, in glassfibre reinforced plastic, but without the up-rated engine and propeller. O-235 118hp engine, 2 blade fixed prop, fuel in firewall tank, single piece canopy. A total of 14 T67Bs were produced.

T67M MkII Firefly
Certified on 20 December 1985, AEIO-320 fuel injected 160hp engine, 2 blade constant speed prop, inverted fuel and oil systems. The T67M MkII replaced the single-piece canopy of the T67M with a two-piece design, and the single fuselage fuel tank with two, larger tanks in the wings.

T67M200 Firefly
Certified on 19 June 1987, the T67M200 was had a more powerful  Lycoming AEIO360-A1E with a three-bladed Hoffman propeller, inverted fuel and oil systems. A total of 26 T67M-200s were produced.

T67C Firefly
Certified on 15 December 1987, the T67C was the last of the "civilian" variants, based on the T67B with an uprated  Lycoming O-320 engine, but without fuel injection and inverted-flight systems found on the T67M variants. Two blade constant speed prop. Two further sub-versions of the T67C copied the two-piece canopy (T67C-2) and wing tanks (T67C-3, sometimes known as the T67D) from the T67M MkII. A total of 28 T67Cs were produced across the three versions.

T67M260 Firefly
Certified on 11 November 1993, the T67M260 added even more power with the six-cylinder  Lycoming AEIO540-D4A5 engine, three blade constant speed prop. Unusually for side-by-side light aircraft, the T67M260 was built to be flown solo from the right-hand seat to allow student pilots to immediately get used to the left-hand throttle found in most military aircraft – earlier models of the T67M had a second throttle on the left-hand sidewall of the cabin. A total of 51 T67M-260s were produced. They were used to successfully train hundreds of RAF, RN, British Army, and foreign and Commonwealth pilots through Joint Elementary Flying Training School until late 2010.

T67M260-T3A Firefly
Certified on 15 December 1993, the last military version of the T67 family was the T67M260-T3A, of which the entire production run of 114 was purchased by the United States Air Force, where it was known as the T-3A. The T-3A was basically the T67M260 with the addition of air conditioning. Although the US media claimed the aircraft was to blame after four aircraft were destroyed in accidents, no engine stoppages or vapour-lock problems with the fuel system were found during very thorough tests at Edwards AFB. All three instructors killed in the accidents came from the C-141, a large-transport aircraft. Their only prior aerobatic experience was in Air Force pilot training in the T-37 and T-38 jet trainers. This, combined with thinner air at the higher density altitude of the Academy airfield and training areas, meant spin recovery was delayed and/or improper spin prevent/recovery techniques were used. Parachutes were not worn on the first fatal accident but were worn on the second and third fatal accidents. Both of these accidents were caused by low altitude spins. Following the three fatal accidents and an engine failure in the Academy landing pattern the fleet was grounded in 1997 and stored without maintenance until being destroyed in 2006.

CT-111 Firefly
Designation by the Canadian Forces internally only as aircraft are registered as civilian aircraft

Operators

Military operators

Bahrain Air Force operates three T67M-260

Belize Defence Force Air Wing – 1 x T67M-260 delivered in 1996 and unclear if still in service.

Royal Jordanian Air Force- 14 × T67M-260

Dutch pilot selection centre:
The Firefly is used by the Royal Netherlands Air Force during pilot selection which is contracted out to TTC at Seppe Airport.

Former military operators

Canadian Forces
The Firefly was used as a basic military training aircraft in Canada. The Canadian Fireflies entered service in 1992 replacing the CT 134 Musketeer. They were, in turn, replaced in 2006 by the German-made Grob G-120 when the contract ended. The aircraft were owned and operated by Bombardier Aerospace under contract to the Canadian Forces.

Royal Hong Kong Auxiliary Air Force

Royal Air Force, Royal Navy, British Army
The Firefly was used as a basic military trainer in the United Kingdom until spring 2010, when they were replaced by Grob Tutor aircraft. The aircraft are owned and operated under contract by a civilian company on behalf of the military. In the UK, it was under a scheme known as "Contractor Owned Contractor Operated" (CoCo).

United States Air Force

Civil operators
 / 
 Royal Hong Kong Auxiliary Air Force/Hong Kong Government Flying Service – retired all four T-67M-200 aircraft after 1996
 Hong Kong Aviation Club – used for pilot aerobatics training

 New Zealand
Auckland Aero Club – one T67B – used for pilot aerobatics training and high-visibility scenic flight.
North Shore Aero Club – one T67M200 – Used for pilot aerobatics training.

 Spain
 FTEJerez – one T67M MarkII – used to provide upset training to graduates
 Turkey
 Turkish Aeronautical Association (Türk Hava Kurumu) – used to give basic flight training to ATPL trainees (T67M200)

 United Kingdom
Swift Aircraft purchased 21 Slingsby T.67M260 Aircraft from Babcock Defense Services in June 2011, to be offered for sale or lease.
Cranfield University operates one T67 to provide flight initiations for aerospace engineers.
Leading Edge Aviation operates one ex Royal Hong Kong Auxiliary Air Force T67 to operate A-UPRT flights for its student pilots.
Ultimate High operates a fleet of three T67M260 aircraft for UPRT training, formation training and experience flights.
Cubair Flight Training  has access to one T67M MkII for aerobatics ratings and instrument flight training.
CRM Aviation use four T67M MkII aircraft for formation training.
https://fptuk.com/ Flight Performance Training] use two T67M MkII aircraft for UPRT flights.

Specifications (T-3A)

See also

References

 Hoyle, Craig. "World Air Forces Directory". Flight International, Vol. 180, No. 5231, 13–19 December 2011, pp. 26–52. ISSN 0015-3710.

External links
https://www.ntsb.gov/_layouts/ntsb.aviation/brief.aspx?ev_id=20141024X52246&key=1
 Official Canadian Forces T67 Firefly page
 UK Type Certificate for the T67 Firefly family
 Marshall Slingsby's Retrieved 18 June 2012
 Tom Cassell's Retrieved 18 June 2012
 Air Force Scrapping Troubled Plane Retrieved 9 September 2006
 AF link: Officials announce T-3A Firefly final disposition with public domain picture.

1970s French sport aircraft
Fournier aircraft
Firefly
Single-engined tractor aircraft
Low-wing aircraft
Aircraft first flown in 1974